Lee Philips (born Leon Friedman; January 10, 1927 – March 3, 1999) was an American actor, film director, and television director.

Life and career
Philips was born in New York. His acting career started on Broadway, and peaked with a starring role as Michael Rossi in the film adaptation of Peyton Place opposite Lana Turner. He appeared in the Paddy Chayefsky motion picture, Middle of the Night (1959) as Kim Novak's character's ex-husband, George. The following year, Philips was cast as the compassionate Lieutenant Wood in the episode, "The White Healer", on the syndicated television anthology series, Death Valley Days, hosted by Stanley Andrews.

Later in the 1960s, his career shifted towards directing, with credits ranging from the television series of Peyton Place to The Dick Van Dyke Show.

He still did occasional acting, such as his appearance in 1963 in "Never Wave Goodbye", a two-part episode of The Fugitive. He also guest starred on The Outer Limits in the premiere episode, "The Galaxy Being". Also in 1963, he played a lead role in "Passage on the Lady Anne", an hour-long episode of The Twilight Zone; he returned to the show the following year in the episode "Queen of the Nile", where he plays a reporter named Jordan "Jordy" Herrick. He was Juror Number 5 in the Studio One version of Twelve Angry Men. He appeared in Flipper in 1964 and also made two guest appearances on Perry Mason in 1965: as Kevin Lawrence in "The Case of the Golden Venom", less than nine months later he played as murderer Gordon Evans in "The Case of the Fatal Fortune". Also guest starred on the Combat!: episode: "A Walk with an Eagle". In 1973 he directed The Girl Most Likely to... starring Stockard Channing. He directed Dick Van Dyke on several episodes of Diagnosis: Murder.

Philips died from progressive supranuclear palsy (PSP).

Filmography

References

External links
 
 
 

1927 births
1999 deaths
American male film actors
American male television actors
American male stage actors
American film directors
American television directors
20th-century American male actors
Male actors from New York City